Butch Lewis (born December 1, 1987) is a former American Football offensive lineman. Lewis was signed by the Kansas City Chiefs as an undrafted free agent in 2011. Following the 2011 NFL Preseason, Lewis was waived by the Chiefs. After clearing waivers, Lewis was signed to the Chiefs practice squad. Lewis was released from the practice squad on September 8, 2011. Shortly after, Lewis was re-signed to the practice squad, only to be released once again on October 5. On October 26, 2011 Lewis was signed to the Vikings practice squad. Lewis went to high school at Regis Jesuit in Aurora, Colorado where he was a Parade Magazine All-American, and played his college football at the University of Southern California.

References

External links
 Butch Lewis's NFL.com Profile
 Butch Lewis's Chiefs profile
 Butch Lewis's USC Profile

Living people
American football offensive tackles
USC Trojans football players
Kansas City Chiefs players
1987 births